Paralogidae is an extinct family of griffinfly in the order Meganisoptera. There are at least two genera and three described species in Paralogidae.

Genera
These two genera belong to the family Paralogidae:
 † Paralogus Scudder 1893
 † Truemania Bolton 1934

References

Meganisoptera
Prehistoric insect families
Carboniferous insects